Sir William Courtenay (1451–1512) of Powderham in Devon, was a Lancastrian loyal to Henry Tudor, the future King Henry VII.

Courtenay was the eldest son and heir of Sir William Courtenay (1428–1485) of Powderham and Margaret, daughter of William Bonville, Baron Chewton Mendip.

In about 1476 he married Cecily Cheney, daughter of Sir John Cheney of Pinhoe, by whom he had children including four sons:
Sir William Courtenay (1477–1535), eldest son and heir.
Sir James Courtenay (1479–1529) of Upcott, Devon. 
Piers Courtenay (1481 – 2 Oct 1508)
Edward Courtenay

He also had seven daughters: Elizabeth (born 1483), Anne (born 1485), Joan, Cecily, Eleanor (born 1493), Margaret, and one other.

Courtenay died in November 1512.

Sources
Vivian, Lt.Col. J.L., (Ed.) The Visitations of the County of Devon: Comprising the Heralds' Visitations of 1531, 1564 & 1620, Exeter, 1895

References

External links
 http://thepeerage.com/p935.htm#i9344
 http://www.stirnet.com/ (subscription only)
 
 http://www.tudorplace.com/

Knights Bachelor
Year of birth missing
15th-century births
1512 deaths
15th-century English people
16th-century English people
People of the Wars of the Roses
English knights
William